The 2023 Monterrey Open (also known as the Abierto GNP Seguros for sponsorship reasons) was a women's tennis tournament played on outdoor hard courts. It was the 15th edition of the Monterrey Open and a WTA 250 tournament on the 2023 WTA Tour. It took place at the Club Sonoma in Monterrey, Mexico, from February 27th to March 5th, 2023.

Champions

Singles 

  Donna Vekić def.  Caroline Garcia, 6–4, 3–6, 7–5

Doubles 

  Yuliana Lizarazo /  María Paulina Pérez García def.  Kimberly Birrell /  Fernanda Contreras Gómez, 6–3, 5–7, [10–5]

Points and prize money

Point distribution

Prize money 

*per team

Singles main draw entrants

Seeds 

1 Rankings as of February 20, 2023.

Other entrants 
The following players received wildcards into the main draw: 
  Marie Bouzková
  Fernanda Contreras Gómez
  Emma Navarro 

The following player received a special exempt into the main draw:
  Rebecca Peterson

The following players received entry from the qualifying draw:
  Caroline Dolehide
  Despina Papamichail
  Kamilla Rakhimova
  Elena-Gabriela Ruse
  Lesia Tsurenko
  Sachia Vickery

Withdrawals 
Before the tournament
  Kateryna Baindl → replaced by  Kaja Juvan
  Beatriz Haddad Maia → replaced by  Ysaline Bonaventure
  Rebecca Peterson → replaced by  Marina Bassols Ribera

Doubles main draw entrants

Seeds 

 Rankings as of February 20, 2023.

Other entrants 
The following pairs received wildcards into the doubles main draw:
  Kimberly Birrell /  Fernanda Contreras Gómez
  Marcela Zacarías /  Renata Zarazúa

Withdrawals 
  Jesika Malečková /  Renata Voráčová → replaced by  Jesika Malečková /  Despina Papamichail

References

External links 
 Official website

2023 WTA Tour
2023
2023 in Mexican tennis
February 2023 sports events in Mexico
March 2023 sports events in Mexico